Nangkita is a rural locality on Fleurieu Peninsula in South Australia, south of the capital, Adelaide.

Nangkita was founded as a Village Settlement in the 1890s as a commune in a scheme set up by the South Australian government under Part VII of the Crown Lands Amendment Act 1893, intended to mitigate the effects of the depression then affecting the Colony. The settlement grew a magnificent crop of tobacco, but the potato and onion crops were ravaged by grubs. The commune closed not long after that.

See also
Cox Scrub Conservation Park

References

Towns in South Australia